Martin Burrell  (October 19, 1858 – March 20, 1938) was a Canadian politician.

Born in Faringdon, Berkshire (now Oxfordshire), Burrell emigrated to Canada as a young man, where he eventually became a fruit grower on a farm about two miles east of Grand Forks, British Columbia.  His farm was the largest apple tree nursery in the province.

He was elected mayor of Grand Forks, British Columbia in 1903. He first ran unsuccessfully for the House of Commons of Canada as the Conservative candidate in the 1904 federal election for the constituency of Yale—Cariboo. He was elected in the 1908 federal election and re-elected in 1911.  In 1917 he was re-elected as a Unionist.

Burrell served as the Minister of Agriculture in the Borden government from 1911 to 1917, and from 1917 to 1919, as Secretary of State of Canada and Minister of Mines. From 1919 to 1920, he was the Minister of Customs and Inland Revenue. He also helped secure the departure of the Komagata Maru, against those mistreating the passengers and prolonging the departure date.

A fire damaged the Parliament Buildings in 1917, and Burrell was badly injured in it.  From that time he filled the position of librarian for the Library of Parliament.  After leaving politics, he remained in Ottawa and kept the position of Parliamentary Librarian until his death in 1938. He is buried in Beechwood Cemetery.

Burrell Creek near Grand Forks, British Columbia, is named in his honour.

External links
 Serving Agriculture: Canada's Ministers of Agriculture
 
 Burrell Creek

1858 births
1938 deaths
English emigrants to Canada
Conservative Party of Canada (1867–1942) MPs
Members of the House of Commons of Canada from British Columbia
Members of the King's Privy Council for Canada
Unionist Party (Canada) MPs
People from Faringdon
Boundary Country
Parliamentary Librarians of Canada